Josef Kapín (19 May 1945 – 14 August 2014) was a Czechoslovak boxer. He competed in the men's light heavyweight event at the 1968 Summer Olympics.

References

1945 births
2014 deaths
Czech male boxers
Czechoslovak male boxers
Olympic boxers of Czechoslovakia
Boxers at the 1968 Summer Olympics
Sportspeople from Prague
Light-heavyweight boxers